James Buchanan Holland (November 14, 1857 – April 24, 1914) was a United States district judge of the United States District Court for the Eastern District of Pennsylvania.

Education and career

Born in Gwynedd Township (now Lower Gwynedd Township and Upper Gwynedd Township), Montgomery County, Pennsylvania, Holland read law to enter the bar in 1887. He was clerk of county commissioners for Montgomery County from 1882 to 1887, and was then in private practice in Montgomery County from 1887 to 1904, also serving as a solicitor in Montgomery County from 1887 to 1893 and District Attorney of Montgomery County from 1893 to 1896. He was in the United States Navy from 1898 to 1900. He was the United States Attorney for the Eastern District of Pennsylvania from 1900 to 1904.

Federal judicial service

On April 14, 1904, Holland was nominated by President Theodore Roosevelt to a new seat on the United States District Court for the Eastern District of Pennsylvania created by 33 Stat. 155. He was confirmed by the United States Senate on April 19, 1904, and received his commission the same day. Holland served in that capacity until his death on April 24, 1914, in Conshohocken, Pennsylvania.

References

Sources
 

1857 births
1914 deaths
County clerks in Pennsylvania
Judges of the United States District Court for the Eastern District of Pennsylvania
United States district court judges appointed by Theodore Roosevelt
20th-century American judges
19th-century American politicians
United States federal judges admitted to the practice of law by reading law
19th-century American judges
Politicians from Montgomery County, Pennsylvania
District attorneys in Pennsylvania